Funaota is an islet that is the northern point of Nukufetau atoll, Tuvalu.

References

Islands of Tuvalu
Pacific islands claimed under the Guano Islands Act
Nukufetau